Arcobacter aquimarinus is a species of bacteria first recovered from mussels, with type strain W63T (= CECT 8442T = LMG 27923T).

References

Further reading
Whiteduck-Léveillée, Kerri, et al. "Arcobacter lanthieri sp. nov., isolated from pig and dairy cattle manure." International Journal of Systematic and Evolutionary Microbiology 65.8 (2015): 2709–2716.
Giacometti, Federica, et al. "Characterization of Arcobacter suis isolated from water buffalo (Bubalus bubalis) milk." Food microbiology 51 (2015): 186–191.

External links
LPSN

Campylobacterota
Bacteria described in 2015